Amanda Everlove (born 1988 or 1989) is an American Paralympic swimmer.

Early life and career
Everlove was born in Valencia, California, but upon finishing her freshman year of St. Mary’s High School in July 2005, she and her family moved to Wichita, Kansas. There, she qualified for the meeting with the International Paralympics Team at Portland, Oregon where she swam 100-meter butterfly. In 2007 she won gold for 50 metre freestyle and 2 silvers for 200 metre individual medley and 100 metre backstroke respectively at Parapan American Games. In 2010 she won bronze at World Championships for another 200 metre individual medley. In 2011, at another Parapan American Games she won a gold one for 100 metre fly and the same year got silver again, this time for 100 metre breaststroke. In summer 2008, with her parents' permission she left Kansas and settled in Colorado Springs, Colorado to attend training at the United States Olympic Training Center. As a result, she participated at Paralympic swimming event at the 2008 Summer Paralympic Games in Beijing, China where she won silver medals in the 100m butterfly, 50m freestyle and 200m individual medley. After the Paralympics she moved to Indiana where she decided to study chemical engineering at the St. Mary’s College. Upon completing a semester there, she decided to pursue a degree in pharmacy at the Ohio Northern University instead, where, in 2011, she met Peggy Ewald, her new coach. In 2012 she returned to Colorado Springs at began attending University of Colorado.

References

External links 
 
 

1980s births
Living people
Paralympic swimmers of the United States
Paralympic silver medalists for the United States
Swimmers at the 2008 Summer Paralympics
Medalists at the 2008 Summer Paralympics
S8-classified Paralympic swimmers
Saint Mary's College (Indiana) alumni
Ohio Northern University alumni
University of Colorado alumni
People from Valencia, Santa Clarita, California
Medalists at the World Para Swimming Championships
Paralympic medalists in swimming
Medalists at the 2007 Parapan American Games
Medalists at the 2011 Parapan American Games
American female freestyle swimmers
American female backstroke swimmers
American female breaststroke swimmers
American female butterfly swimmers
American female medley swimmers
21st-century American women